Cara Black and Liezel Huber were the defending champions, but the pair lost in the first round to Julie Ditty and Yuliana Fedak.

Alona Bondarenko and Kateryna Bondarenko won the title, defeating Eva Hrdinová and Vladimíra Uhlířová in the final 6–1, 6–4.

Seeds

Key
Q - Qualifier
WC - Wild card
Alt - Alternates

Draw

External links
Draws

Doubles 2008
Open Gaz de France